Manatí is a municipality and town in the Las Tunas Province of Cuba. It is located in the north-western part of the province, on the northern coast of Cuba, in the Manati Bay.

Demographics
In 2004, the municipality of Manatí had a population of 33,573.

See also
Municipalities of Cuba
List of cities in Cuba

References

External links

Populated places in Las Tunas Province